Russell Holland is a Grand Prix motorcycle racer from Hornsby, Australia. Early in his career, he raced for Teknic Honda, and in 2013, he joined the Inglis Honda Racing team. 

In 2009, while racing with the Demolition Plus team (along with Craig Coxhell and Gareth Jones), Holland won The Bel-Ray 6 Hour at Oran Park, the last year the event was held at the site before the Park was demolished.

Career statistics

By season

References

External links
 Profile on motogp.com

1983 births
Living people
Australian motorcycle racers
250cc World Championship riders
Superbike World Championship riders
Supersport World Championship riders
Motorcycle racers from Sydney